Dugay Islet is a small island with an area of 0.44 ha in Bass Strait, north-western Tasmania.  

It is part of Tasmania's Hunter Island Group which lies between north-west Tasmania and King Island.

Fauna
Breeding seabirds and shorebirds include little penguin, short-tailed shearwater, common diving-petrel, Pacific gull and sooty oystercatcher.

References

North West Coast of Tasmania
Islands of Bass Strait